is a passenger railway station located in Tarumi-ku, Kobe, Hyōgo Prefecture, Japan, operated by the private Sanyo Electric Railway.

Lines

Station layout
The station consists of two elevated side platforms with the station building underneath.

Platforms

Adjacent stations

|-
!colspan=5|Sanyo Electric Railway

History
It was renamed  on November 20, 1943, and renamed to its present name on April 7,1991.

Passenger statistics
In fiscal 2018, the station was used by an average of 5761 passengers daily (boarding passengers only).

Surrounding area
 JR Tarumi Station
 Tarumi Ward Office

See also
List of railway stations in Japan

References

External links

 Official website (Sanyo Electric Railway) 

Railway stations in Japan opened in 1917
Railway stations in Kobe